HNLMS Tjerk Hiddes may refer to following ships of the Royal Netherlands Navy:
 , a  launched in 1939 and scuttled incomplete in 1940
 , a British N-class destroyer launched in 1941 as HMS Nonpareil but transferred to the Netherlands and renamed before completion in 1942. She was transferred to Indonesia and renamed RI Gadjah Mada in 1951 and scrapped in 1961.
 , a  
 , a  launched in 1989. She was sold to Chile and renamed Almirante Riveros in 2007

Royal Netherlands Navy ship names